Anthrenocerus stellatus is a species of beetle, native to Australia.  It is within the genus Anthrenocerus and the family Dermestidae.

References

Dermestidae